Fanta Kola Inglesa is a Peruvian soft drink. It is red in color and cherry-strawberry flavor. Introduced in 1912, Kola Inglesa currently comes in several sizes including a 3-liter bottle and a 500ml bottle. The drink is popular across Peru as in some Latin American markets in the United States. The brand was first owned by Manuel A. Ventura, who created the drink for the Peruvian market. In 1971 the recipe was sold to Mr. Enrique Heredia Alarcón (Pepsi's bottler in Peru at the time). It was during this time that the drink became highly popular among Peruvians. In 1997, the brand was sold to The Coca-Cola Company along with Agua San Luis. In 2013 the name changed to Fanta Kola Inglesa.

See also
 List of Coca-Cola brands
 Fanta

References

External links
  The official page of Fanta & Fanta Kola Inglesa

Cola brands
Peruvian drinks
Coca-Cola brands